Bigliardi is an Italian surname. Notable people with the surname include:

Matthew P. Bigliardi (1920–1996), American bishop of the Episcopal Church
Tebaldo Bigliardi (born 1963), Italian footballer

Italian-language surnames